Kuwait's first district comprises nineteen residential areas.

Areas in the First District

Sharq
Dasma
Mitba
Dasman
Bneid Al Gar
Daʿiya
Sha'ab
Failaka
Hawally
Nigra
Maidan Hawalli
Bayān
Mishref
Salmiya
Bi'da
Ras (Ras Al Salmiya)
Salwa
Rumaithiya
Mubarak Al Abdullah

References
The areas are officially stated by Ministry of Interior circular. (The numbering above is also by the Ministry of Interior)

Politics of Kuwait
Electoral districts of Kuwait